Lamoria medianalis is a species of snout moth. It is found in Zimbabwe.

References

Endemic fauna of Zimbabwe
Moths described in 1917
Tirathabini
Lepidoptera of Zimbabwe
Moths of Sub-Saharan Africa